Khonsa West is one of the 60 assembly constituencies of  Arunachal Pradesh a north east state of India. It is part of Arunachal East Lok Sabha constituency.

Members of Legislative Assembly
 2019: Tirong Aboh, National People's Party

Election results

2019 by-election

References

Assembly constituencies of Arunachal Pradesh
Tirap district